Financial Reporting Council Bangladesh is a Bangladesh government regulatory agency responsible for regulating auditing and audit firms.

History
Financial Reporting Council Bangladesh was established on 9 September 2015 as an independent regulatory agency. The agency is controlled by 12 member governing body which has representatives from the government, Bangladesh Bank, Bangladesh Securities and Exchange Commission, Federation of Bangladesh Chambers of Commerce & Industries, professional accountants association and academia. It was created through the passage of Financial Reporting Act 2015 in the parliament of Bangladesh.

In 2020 it signed agreements with International Valuation Standards Council, International Federation of Accountants, and IFRS Foundation.

References

2015 establishments in Bangladesh
Organisations based in Dhaka
Government agencies of Bangladesh